Capture of Malta can refer to:
 Capture of Malta (218 BC), by the Romans from the Carthaginians
 Capture of Malta (870), by the Aghlabids from the Byzantines
 Capture of Malta (1091), by the Normans from Muslims
 Capture of Malta (1798), by the French from the Hospitallers